Charles Henry Smith (June 15, 1826 – August 24, 1903) was an American writer and politician from the state of Georgia. He used the pen name Bill Arp for nearly 40 years. He had a national reputation as a homespun humorist during his lifetime, and at least four communities are named for him (Arp, Banks County, Georgia; Bill Arp, Georgia; Arp, Texas; and Arp, Tennessee).

Life and career

Early life
Charles Henry Smith was born on June 15, 1826, in Lawrenceville, Georgia. He attended the University of Georgia, and married Mary Octavia Hutchins, the daughter of a wealthy lawyer and plantation owner. Their family grew to include 10 children who survived to adulthood. Smith studied law with his father-in-law, was admitted to the bar, and became an attorney in Rome, Georgia, where he lived at Oak Hill before selling it to Andrew M. Sloan. (Sloan later sold the estate to prominent Rome resident Thomas Berry in 1871.)

At the beginning of the American Civil War, Smith wrote his first humorous letter under the Bill Arp pseudonym. Others were published by Southern newspapers intermittently throughout the war. They pleaded the case for the Southern cause while joking about the hardships of white Southerners in wartime. Meanwhile, Smith served as a major in the 8th Georgia Infantry Regiment and on the staffs of several Confederate generals, including Francis Bartow.

Career

After the war, Smith returned to Rome, but later moved to the nearby city of Cartersville, Georgia, living there after 1877. Active in politics, he served as alderman, mayor, and a member of the Georgia State Senate.

Smith's literary career thrived after the war, and letters that he wrote as "Bill Arp" to the editor of the Atlanta Constitution earned him a position as a columnist for the newspaper. He typically wrote in "Cracker dialect" about politics, government, current events, race relations, farming, and other topics.  He edited newspapers in Rome and Cartersville, Georgia and Atlanta and published five books: Bill Arp's Letters (1870), Bill Arp's Scrap Book (1884), The Farm and Fireside (1891), A School History of Georgia (1893), Bill Arp: From the Uncivil War to Date (1903). He also wrote a monthly column for the Southern Cultivator.

As his fame grew, Smith became a successful lecturer and speechmaker.

Like many prominent white Southerners during the Reconstruction era, Smith was nostalgic for the Old South and hostile to black equality. He criticized African-American education in the South and in some columns endorsed lynching of blacks to enforce white supremacy. He supported the disenfranchisement movement of the late 1890s, arguing that Southern blacks were not capable of casting an intelligent vote. But some of his "Bill Arp" writings continued to focus on humor and rural life.

Death
Smith died on August 24, 1903, in Cartersville, Georgia, where he is buried at Oak Hill Cemetery.

See also

 Literature of Georgia (U.S. state)

References

Collected works online at UNC
History of the University of Georgia by Thomas Walter Reed, Thomas Walter Reed,  Imprint:  Athens, Georgia : University of Georgia, ca. 1949, pp. 522–525
"Alias Bill Arp: Charles Henry Smith and the South's 'Goodly Heritage' (Athens: University of Georgia Press, 1991) by Dr. David B. Parker.

External links
Bill Arp from the Uncivil War to Date, 1861–1903. Atlanta, Ga.: The Hudgins Publishing Company, 1903, c1902.
Birthplace of Bill Arp historical marker
Bill Arp's archives at the Stuart A. Rose Manuscript, Archives, and Rare Book Library, Emory University.

1826 births
1903 deaths
Writers from Georgia (U.S. state)
American newspaper editors
Mayors of places in Georgia (U.S. state)
People of Georgia (U.S. state) in the American Civil War
University of Georgia people
People from Rome, Georgia
American white supremacists
Georgia (U.S. state) state senators
Confederate States Army officers
19th-century American politicians